Rapatovo is a rural locality (a selo) and the administrative centre of Rapatovsky Selsoviet, Chekmagushevsky District, Bashkortostan, Russia. The population was 830 as of 2010. There are 8 streets.

Geography 
Rapatovo is located 11 km south of Chekmagush (the district's administrative centre) by road. Starobikkino is the nearest rural locality.

References 

Rural localities in Chekmagushevsky District